Dominick Lynch (1754  in Galway, Ireland - 1824) was an Irish born American wine merchant who made his fortune in Bruges, Belgium and then New York City, founding what is today Rome, New York (originally named Lynchville by him after himself).

He had thirteen children, all of whom he named streets after in Lynchville.

Lynch was one of some three hundred people to attend George Washington's inauguration as the first President of the United States in 1789.

Lynch's son, Dominic Lynch ll was instrumental in introducing Bordeaux wine from the Chateau Margaux to the United States market and is also credited with having brought Grand Opera to the nation.

Dominick Lynch and several members of his family (including Dominic ll) are buried in the catacombs at the Old St. Patrick's Cathedral in Manhattan in New York City.

References

1754 births
1824 deaths
People from Galway (city)
Wine merchants
Irish emigrants to the United States (before 1923)